Bangkinang, is a town in Riau Province of Indonesia. As the capital of the regency adjacent to the provincial capital and a connection to the area of West Sumatra.
The majority of the population is Muslim.

History
Based on the decree of the Military Governor of Central Sumatra Number: 10/GM/STE/49 dated 9 November 1949, Kampar Regency is one area in Riau Province Level II consists of Kawedanaan Pelalawan, Pasir Pangarayan, Bangkinang and the Outer City Pekanbaru the capital is Pekanbaru. Then, based on Law No.. 12 In 1956 the capital was moved to Kampar Regency new Bangkinang and implemented on June 6, 1967.
Since the Kampar district formed in 1949 to 2006 was 21 times tenure District Head. Title regent until the sixth (H. Soebrantas S.) Kampar Regency capital was moved to Bangkinang by Law no. 12 in 1956.
The factors that support the transfer of the capital to Bangkinang include:

1. Pekanbaru is the capital of Riau province.
2. Pekanbaru besides being the capital of the province also has become a city.
3. Given the extent of Kampar Regency Capital naturally moved to Bangkinang to increase efficiency and improve the management of government services to the public.
4. Future prospects Kampar Regency may no longer be developed well from Pekanbaru.

Bangkinang located in the middle of Kampar regency, which might be easier to implement coaching to all districts and vice versa.

Climate
Bangkinag has a tropical rainforest climate (Af) with heavy rainfall year-round.

Tourism
Some interesting place in Bangkinang, among others:
 Muara Takus Temple (±  from Bangkinang)
 STANUM Recreational Park
 Bukit Naang Recreational Park
 Merangin Waterfall
 Kandil Kemilau Emas Museum
 Siabu Hill (Bukit Siabu)
 Koto Panjang Dam (PLTA Koto Panjang)
 Cadika Hill Recreational Park (Taman Rekereasi Bukit Cadika)
 Lontiok House (Rumah Asli Lontiok)

References

Populated places in Riau
Regency seats of Riau